Participation banking is a name given to Islamic banks mainly in Turkey, as well as in the broader MENA region. While participation banks reached only 2% of net assets in the year 2000, in 2010 the rate increased up to 4.3%. In the third quarter of 2013, the rate increased up to 6.1% with 90.7 billion TL in assets. Regarding the profit margins of the participation banks, Malaysia, Indonesia and Gulf countries have more than 50% of the market share, it is stated that Turkey has more potential in growth. Also, Turkey, Pakistan, Bangladesh, and Indonesia stand as the leading countries among the participation banks. Saudi Arabia, the UAE and Malaysia are the three largest participation banking markets, in terms of assets. Iran has 36% of the worldwide assets of the participation banks, Malaysia has 17%, Saudi Arabia has 14% and Turkey has 3.1% of the market share. According to Ernst & Young, the assets of global participation banking reached US $930 billion in 2015, with growth rates declining across all regions compared to previous years.

List of participation banks
Ziraat Participation Bank
Vakıf Participation Bank

Albaraka Türk Participation Bank

Defunct
Asia Participation Bank (founded 1996, closed 2016)

References

Islamic banking
Banking in Turkey
Banking terms